"Spin That Wheel" is a song by Belgian group Technotronic released under the name "Hi Tek 3 featuring Ya Kid K" in 1990. Hi Tek 3 are listed as Kovali, El Sati and Yosef.

Releases 
The track appeared on the Teenage Mutant Ninja Turtles soundtrack and was also released as a single. In some territories it was released as "Spin That Wheel (Turtles Get Real)". References to drug use ("I smoke the mic like weed" and "This hypes you up like speed") were edited out of the soundtrack album. A David Morales remix of the track was also included on the Technotronic album Trip on This: The Remixes.

In Britain, "Spin That Wheel" was first issued in January 1990 and reached #69, but became a bigger hit when re-released that September, peaking at #15. In the USA the song reached #69 on the Billboard Hot 100, #8 on Hot Dance Music/Maxi-Singles Sales, #3 on Hot Dance Club Play and #39 on Hot R&B/Hip-Hop Songs.

Critical reception 
Bill Coleman from Billboard commented, "From the Technotronic stable comes the jammin' club offering "Spin That Wheel" by Hi Tek 3 featuring Technotronic's Ya Kid K on lead vocal. The energy that this track emanates is amazing and can't help but heat up a dancefloor. It's mixed by Jo Bogaert; we prefer the "Swing That Beat" version and "bass-a-pella" to those mixes sporting the weathered "whoa yeah" hook. Don't miss ... "

Selected track listings

UK 7" 
 "Spin That Wheel (Radio Version)"
 "Spin That Wheel (Dub Edit)"

UK 12" and CD 
 "Spin That Wheel (First Feel Mix)"
 "Spin That Wheel (Radio Version)"
 "Spin That Wheel (Dub Mix)"

UK 12" maxi-single 
 "Spin That Wheel (Extended Flick Mix)"   
 "Spin That Wheel (Dub Mix)"               6:15
 "Spin That Wheel (Flick Mix)"
 "Spin That Wheel (Spin That Body Mix)"
 "Spin That Wheel (Swing That Beat Mix)"   6:09
 "Spin That Wheel (Bass-Apella Mix)"       5:56

Charts

Weekly charts

Year-end charts

References 

Techno songs
1990 singles
Teenage Mutant Ninja Turtles music
Technotronic songs
1990 songs
SBK Records singles
Dance Pool singles
Teenage Mutant Ninja Turtles (1990 film series)
hip house songs